Cochylimorpha woliniana is a species of moth of the family Tortricidae. It is found in Sweden, France, Germany, Denmark, Austria, Switzerland, Italy, the Czech Republic, Slovakia, Hungary, Bulgaria, Romania, Poland, Latvia, Ukraine, Russia, Kyrgyzstan and Mongolia.

The wingspan is 13–17 mm. Adults have been recorded from wing from June to August.

The larvae feed on Artemisia absinthium. Larvae can be found from August to May.

Subspecies
Cochylimorpha woliniana woliniana
Cochylimorpha woliniana luteola (Kuznetzov, 1975) (Kyrgyzstan, western Siberia, Mongolia)

References

Moths described in 1868
Cochylimorpha
Moths of Europe
Moths of Asia